Passara is a town in Badulla District, Uva Province of Sri Lanka.

Education
The government owned schools in Passara area are listed below.

 Passara Tamil Maha Vidyalaya
 Passara Central College.
 Passara Gamunu Maha Vidyalaya.
 Gonagala Maha Vidyalaya.
 Meeriyabedda Vidyalaya.
 Sapuroda Vidyalaya.
 Paramahankada Maha Vidyalaya.
 Thennuge Vidyalaya.
 Madugasthalawa Vidyalaya.
 Gonakele Tamil Maha Vidyalaya.
 Passara Muslim Maha Vidyalaya.
 Dameriya No.1 Tamil Vidyalaya.
 Dameriya No.2 Tamil Vidyalaya.
 Dameriya No.3 Tamil Vidyalaya.
 Elteb No.1 Tamil Vidyalaya.
 Elteb No.2 Tamil Vidyalaya.
 Elteb No.3 Tamil Vidyalaya.
 Thennuge Tamil Vidyalaya.
 Galbokka Tamil Vidyalaya.
 Mahadowa Tamil Vidyalaya.
 Passara No. 2 Tamil Vidyalaya.
 Passara No.4 Tamil Vidyalaya.

Tourist attractions
 Passara Raja Maha Vihara is an ancient temple, believed to be built during the reign of King Sri Vikrama Rajasingha and located in the Pallegama area.
 Ardun Falls is a waterfall located near to Passara Madolsima road.
Bambaragala Pathana
Namunukula Mountain Range
Kovilkada mountain
Lunugala mountain

References

External links 
 Passara Divisional Secretariat

Towns in Badulla District